Danny is a Canadian documentary film, directed by Aaron Zeghers and Lewis Bennett and released in 2019. The film is a portrait of Zeghers's uncle Danny Ryder, compiled entirely from VHS footage Ryder recorded of himself in the 1990s during his fatal battle with leukemia.

The film received a Vancouver Film Critics Circle award nomination for Best Canadian Documentary at the Vancouver Film Critics Circle Awards 2019.

References

External links
 

2019 films
2019 documentary films
Canadian documentary films
Documentary films about cancer
2010s English-language films
2010s Canadian films